Stadion de Geusselt is a multi-use stadium in Maastricht, Netherlands.  It is currently used mostly for football matches and is the home stadium of MVV Maastricht. The stadium is able to hold 10,000 people and was built in 1961.

The pitch is artificial turf.

History 
The first game played at the stadium was a 2-0 win for MVV Maastricht over Willem II in 1961.  It was renovated in 1987.

References

MVV Maastricht
Football venues in the Netherlands
Sports venues in Limburg (Netherlands)
Buildings and structures in Maastricht